Juma Mkambi (1955 – 21 November 2010) was a Tanzanian footballer who played as a midfielder and has represented the Tanzania national team.

Career
Mkambi started playing football with local side Nyota Africa. He joined Yanga in 1979, where he would spend most of his career. In the late 1980s, he moved to Yanga's rivals Pan African FC and then finished his career at Super Star.

Mkambi made several appearances for the senior Tanzania national football team, including three FIFA World Cup qualifying matches, and played at the 1980 African Cup of Nations finals.

Personal
Mkambi died in a Dar es Salaam hospital at age 55 on 21 November 2010.

References

External links

1955 births
2010 deaths
Tanzanian footballers
Tanzania international footballers
1980 African Cup of Nations players

Association football midfielders